Gamma 3 is the third studio album released by the rock band Gamma. It was released in 1982.

Track listing
All songs by Ronnie Montrose, Mitchell Froom and Jerry Stahl, except where indicated.

Side one
"What's Gone Is Gone" – 5:30
"Right the First Time" – 3:47
"Moving Violation" (Montrose, Froom, Stahl, Denny Carmassi) – 3:36
"Mobile Devotion" – 6:34

Side two
"Stranger" (Froom, Stahl) – 3:00
"Condition Yellow" (Montrose, Froom, Carmassi) – 4:08
"Modern Girl" – 3:35
"No Way Out" – 4:05
"Third Degree" – 3:47

Personnel
All credits adapted from the original release.
Davey Pattison – vocals
Ronnie Montrose – guitar, producer
Mitchell Froom – keyboards
Glenn Letsch – bass guitar
Denny Carmassi – drums

Production
Jim Gaines – engineer
Dave Frazer, Maureen Droney, Wayne Lewis, Ken Kessie – assistant engineers
Bobby Hata, Donn Landee – mastering at Amigo Studios, Los Angeles

References 

Gamma (band) albums
1982 albums
Elektra Records albums